The Ling Stream flows in the Pothohar region of Northern Pakistan. It starts in the foothills of the Lhetrar area near Kahuta and, flowing and cutting its way through the hilly area, it meets the Swan River near Sihala. The road that joins Islamabad and Azad Kashmir passes it twice. Kingfishers also hunt fish at this stream.

Rivers of Punjab (Pakistan)
Indus basin
Rivers of Pakistan